Frederick French may refer to:

 Frederick John French (1847–1924), Ontario lawyer and political figure
 Fred F. French (Frederick Fillmore French, 1883–1936), real estate developer
 Freddie French (Frederick Thomas James French, 1911–1989), New Zealand rugby union and rugby league footballer